Le Commissaire est bon enfant (The Chief is a nice Fellow) is a one-act comedy by Georges Courteline. It was first performed on December 16, 1899 at the Théâtre du Gymnase Marie Bell in Paris.

Roles
The Chief
Floche
Breloc
A man
Agent Lagrenaille
Agent Garrigou
Mr. Punèz
Mrs. Floche

Published editions
 Also .

Filmed adaptations
1935: Le commissaire est bon enfant, le gendarme est sans pitié, film by Jacques Becker and Pierre Prévert
1974: Le commissaire est bon enfant, television film by Jean Bertho

External links

Televised performance of a staging by Jean-Paul Roussillon, recorded September 5, 1968. First 3:34 may be viewed at no charge; remaining 32 minutes available at charge. Hosted at the Institut national de l'audiovisuel (National Audiovisual Institute of France).
Scanned copy of a paperback reprint of the 1899 Flammarion edition, complete with original photo engravings, at the Open Library

Comedy plays
1899 plays
French plays adapted into films